The Penny Mobs was the names used by the press to describe the early street gang active in Glasgow, Scotland during the early 1870s. As the court system offered heavy fines as an alternative to imprisonment, gang members were often freed after a collection from the gang at a "penny a head" thus earning its name.

The Penny Mobs, like their New York City counterparts, were among many gangs which formed following a large scale migration of Irish immigrants fleeing Ireland during the potato famines of the 1840s and 1850s. One of these gangs, the Ribbon Men, were reported to have blown up a gas holder in Tradeston in 1883.

Although the gangs declined after courts no longer offered fines for offenders, the smaller gangs eventually banded together for mutual protection which gave rise to the prominent gangs of the early 20th century such as The Tongs, the Billy Boys, the Norman Conks, The Tois, The Govans, the Powery Gang, the Soo-Siders, the Rednecks, the Baltic Fleet, the Black Diamond Gang, the Black Hands, the Nudes, the Ruchill Boys and the belters.

Former gangs
Gangs in Scotland
History of Glasgow
1870s in Glasgow
1870s crimes in the United Kingdom 
1870 crimes in the United Kingdom 
1871 crimes in the United Kingdom 
1872 crimes in the United Kingdom 
Street gangs